Maruti B. Chitampalli (Devanagari: मारुती चितम्पल्ली; born 5 November 1932) is a naturalist, wildlife conservationist and Marathi writer from Maharashtra, India.
The  birthdate of Maruti B. Chitampalli is given by him in his autobiography 'Chakvachandan' as 12 November 1932.  
He grew up in Solapur and then went to enroll himself in State Forest Service College in Coimbatore. After completing his training, he joined the services with Maharashtra State government. During his professional life, he moved at various forests and national parks, having live experiences with various entities. This laid the foundation of his interest in writing his literary works, mostly in Marathi.

He retired from Maharashtra state government service as the Deputy Chief Conservator of Forests. He was instrumental in the development of Karnala Bird Sanctuary, Navegaon National Park, Nagzira Sanctuary and Melghat Tiger Project; also constructing orphanages for displaced wildlife at the last two institutions.

He met famous Marathi writer Vyankatesh Madgulkar whom he learnt writing skills.

Chitampalli presided over Marathi Sahitya Sammelan at Solapur in 2006.

He received the Vinda Karandikar Memorial Lifetime Achievement Award from the Government of Maharashtra in 2017.

Literary work
The following are some of Chitampalli's works:

 Ratawa (रातवा)
 Ranvata (रानवाटा)
 Nilawanti (निळावंती)
 Pranikosh (प्राणीकोश)
 Pakshikosh (पक्षीकोश)
 Suwarna Garud (सुवर्ण गरुड)
 Nisargawachan ( निसर्गवाचन)
 Shabdanche Dhan (शब्दांचे धन)
 Jangalache Dene (जंगलाचं देणं)
 Mrugpakshishastra (मृगपक्षीशास्त्र)
 Kesharacha Paus (केशराचा पाऊस)
 Gharatya Palikade (घरट्या पलिकडे)
 Anandadayi Bagale (आनंददायी बगळे)
 Pakshi Jaya Digantara (पक्षी जाय दिगंतरा)
 Chitragriwa: Eka Kabutarachi Katha (चित्रग्रीव : एका कबुतराची कथा)
 Navegavbandhache diwas: (नवेगाव बांधचे दिवस)
 Chaitrapalawi: 2004
 Chakva Chandan : Ek Vanopanishad (चकवा चांदण : एक वनोपनिषद) (Autobiography)
 An Introduction to Mrugpakshishastra of Hansadev (in English)

References

Marathi-language writers
1932 births
People from Solapur
Living people
Indian naturalists
Presidents of the Akhil Bharatiya Marathi Sahitya Sammelan